The Beast of the City is a 1932 American pre-Code gangster film featuring cops as vigilantes and known for its singularly vicious ending. Written by W.R. Burnett, Ben Hecht (uncredited), and John Lee Mahin, and directed by Charles Brabin, the film stars Walter Huston, Jean Harlow, Wallace Ford, Jean Hersholt, and Tully Marshall.

Plot
Police Captain Jim Fitzpatrick (Walter Huston) is a dedicated family man and crime fighter not averse to using violence to fight violence. Although he's been demoted for political reasons, public outcry forces the mayor to take more aggressive action against sleazy gang boss Sam Belmonte (Jean Hersholt), and Fitzpatrick is promoted to police chief. His younger brother, Police Detective Ed Fitzpatrick (Wallace Ford), allows himself to be seduced by a languorously sexy Belmonte gang moll (Jean Harlow) and needs money to continue the relationship. Frustrated when his principled brother will not promote him, he betrays Jim's trust by conspiring with Belmonte's henchmen in a truck hijacking that results in the deaths of a child and another police officer. After a crooked lawyer is able to get those guilty off on all charges, the relentlessly determined Chief turns to vigilantism to rid the city of its "Beasts."

Cast

Mickey Rooney, in an uncredited appearance, played the son of Captain Jim Fitzpatrick (played by Walter Huston) in his first MGM feature.

Production
The Beast of the City originated in consultations between MGM head of production Louis B. Mayer and President Herbert Hoover, who was concerned that the public needed to have greater respect for police officers and other law-enforcement officials.  The film opens with this text: "Instead of the glorification of cowardly gangsters, we need the glorification of policemen who do their duty and give their lives in public protection. If the police had the vigilant, universal backing of public opinion in their communities, if they had the implacable support of the prosecuting authorities and the courts—I am convinced that our police would stamp out the excessive crime—which has disgraced some of our great cities”— President Herbert Hoover.” The film was produced under the working title "City Sentinels"; principal photography took place from November 4 to December 1931 at MGM's studios in Culver City.

After the film was completed, Mayer decided that it was not quite right for MGM's image as the home of family entertainment, because it was too violent, despite its focus on law-and-order.  Mayer ordered that it be exhibited as the bottom feature on double bills. The film was Jean Harlow's opportunity to show MGM that she would cooperate with the studio, and she was rewarded with better roles which would shortly lead to stardom.

See also
 List of American films of 1932

References

External links
 
 
 
 

1932 films
1932 crime films
American police detective films
Films directed by Charles Brabin
American gangster films
American vigilante films
Metro-Goldwyn-Mayer films
American black-and-white films
1930s English-language films
1930s American films